John Robertson "Big John" Richards (February 24, 1875 – October 28, 1947) was an American football player, coach, educator, and public administrator.  He served as the head football coach at Shurtleff College (1897), Colorado College (1905–1909), the University of Wisconsin–Madison (1911, 1917, 1919–1922), and Ohio State University (1912).

Richards' 1912 season at Ohio State was notable for his action of pulling his team from the field during a loss to Penn State due to rough play.  This action was widely ridiculed in contemporary newspapers by commentary such as "Coach Richards of Ohio State, who took his team off the field Saturday because he declared Penn State was too rough, evidently was never on Lake Erie on a choppy sea."

In 1904, Richards was appointed as the principal of a high school in Colorado Springs, Colorado.  Previously he had been a high school football coach and economics instructor in Dubuque, Iowa and a principal of military academies in Minnesota and Missouri.  After retiring from coaching, Richards was a director of the Los Angeles Metropolitan Water District, a part of the Metropolitan Water District of Southern California, from 1929 to 1947.  He died on October 28, 1947 in Los Angeles, California at the age of 72.

Head coaching record

References

External links
 

1875 births
1947 deaths
19th-century players of American football
American football fullbacks
American school principals
Colorado College Tigers football coaches
Ohio State Buckeyes football coaches
Shurtleff Pioneers football coaches
Wisconsin Badgers football coaches
Wisconsin Badgers football players
High school football coaches in Iowa
Sportspeople from Los Angeles
Players of American football from Los Angeles
Sports coaches from Los Angeles